A Little Bit About Us is a tape anthology by Shades of Culture released on CD in 2000.

Track listing
"Who's That" – 3:28
"A Little Bit About Us" – 4:16
"Eye Out" (remix) – 5:04
"Trapped in a Maze" – 5:12
"The Letter" – 3:25
"Nuff Styles" – 4:00
"Good Intense" – 4:19
"Mowin Lawns" – 3:16
"They Don't Understand" – 3:41
"Mad Lyrics" – 4:22
"Boom Lookout" – 3:50
"Eye Out" – 3:39
"Payin' Rent" – 3:59
"The Deep" – 4:07

Shades of Culture albums
2000 compilation albums